1247 Memoria, provisional designation , is a dark Themistian asteroid from the outer regions of the asteroid belt, approximately 37 kilometers in diameter. It was discovered by Marguerite Laugier at Uccle Observatory in 1932, who later named it Memoria in memory of her pleasant stay at the discovering observatory.

Discovery 

Memoria was discovered on 30 August 1932, by French astronomer Marguerite Laugier at the Royal Observatory of Belgium in Uccle. On the same night, it was independently discovered by Soviet astronomer Grigory Neujmin at the Simeiz Observatory on the Crimean peninsula. One week later, on 6 September 1932, it was again independently discovered by German astronomer Karl Reinmuth at Heidelberg Observatory. The Minor Planet Center only recognizes the first discoverer.

Orbit and classification 

Memoria belongs to the Themis family, a very large family of typically carbonaceous asteroids, named after 24 Themis. It orbits the Sun in the outer main-belt at a distance of 2.6–3.7 AU once every 5 years and 6 months (2,025 days; semi-major axis of 3.13 AU). Its orbit has an eccentricity of 0.17 and an inclination of 2° with respect to the ecliptic.

Physical characteristics 

In the Tholen classification, Memorias spectral type is ambiguous, closest to a carbonaceous C-type, and somewhat similar to an X- and F-type asteroid (CXF). The overall spectral type for members of the Themis family is that of a C-type.

Rotation period 

As of 2018, no rotational lightcurve of Memoria has been obtained from photometric observations. The asteroid's rotation period, shape and poles remain unknown.

Diameter and albedo 

According to the surveys carried out by the Infrared Astronomical Satellite IRAS and the NEOWISE mission of NASA's Wide-field Infrared Survey Explorer, Memoria measures 35.97 and 38.906 kilometers in diameter and its surface has an albedo of 0.0846 and 0.078, respectively.

Naming 

This minor planet was named "memoria" (Latin for memory or remembrance) by the French discoverer Marguerite Laugier who remembered the pleasant relationships she had during her stay at the discovering Uccle Observatory, Belgium, in 1932. The official naming citation was mentioned in The Names of the Minor Planets by Paul Herget in 1955.

References

External links 
 Asteroid Lightcurve Database (LCDB), query form (info )
 Dictionary of Minor Planet Names, Google books
 Asteroids and comets rotation curves, CdR – Observatoire de Genève, Raoul Behrend
 Discovery Circumstances: Numbered Minor Planets (1)-(5000) – Minor Planet Center
 
 

001247
Discoveries by Marguerite Laugier
Named minor planets
001247
19320830